Newport is a station on the Hudson–Bergen Light Rail (HBLR) located at Mall Drive East in Jersey City, New Jersey. There are two tracks and an island platform. Formerly known as Pavonia/Newport, current NJ Transit maps and timetables refer to this station as "Newport", following a similar change several years earlier in the name of the adjacent PATH station.

The station opened on November 18, 2000. Northbound service from the station is available to Hoboken Terminal and Tonnelle Avenue, in North Bergen. Southbound service is available to West Side Avenue in Jersey City and 8th Street in Bayonne. Connection to PATH trains to midtown Manhattan and to New Jersey Transit commuter train service are available at Hoboken Terminal. Transfers to PATH trains to Newark, Harrison, and downtown Manhattan are available at Exchange Place.

In January 2019, it was announced that connecting New York Waterway ferry service would be restored in the summer of 2019 at a new rebuilt pier. Ferry service was discontinued in January 2014 due to deteriorating pier conditions. The Hudson River Waterfront Walkway to Hoboken Terminal also had been recently completed allowing access to the ferry services at the terminal from Newport.

As of 2014, it is the busiest station on the HBLR system (with an average of 6,122 passenger boardings daily).

Station layout

Gallery

References

External links

Subway Nut station info and photos
 north entrance from Google Maps Street View
 south entrance from Google Maps Street View

Hudson-Bergen Light Rail stations
Transportation in Jersey City, New Jersey
Railway stations in the United States opened in 2000
2000 establishments in New Jersey